Live from Clear Channel Stripped 2008 is the second live album featuring songs by American singer-songwriter Taylor Swift, released by Big Machine Records on April 24, 2020, without Swift's approval. It was recorded in 2008 but only released after the masters to her older music had changed hands in a 2019 purchase of Big Machine by American media proprietor Scooter Braun. Swift denounced Live from Clear Channel on her social media accounts, calling it "shameless greed in the time of coronavirus" and asked fans not to buy or stream the album. Earning only 33 units in its first week in the United States, the live album was unsuccessful, and did not enter any official chart worldwide.

Background and release 

The album was recorded shortly after the beginning of Swift's professional career, while she was promoting her second studio album, Fearless (2008). The album is composed of songs from her first two studio albums and her second EP, Beautiful Eyes (2008). It was released on streaming platforms without any prior announcement on April 24, 2020. According to Swift, the recording was made during a 2008 Clear Channel affiliates' internet-only performance when she was 18 years old. In a social media post, Swift stated that she did not authorize the release, calling it "just another case of shameless greed in the time of coronavirus. So tasteless, but very transparent." Swift's statement also mentioned Braun's financial backers: 23 Capital, The Carlyle Group, and Alexander Soros and the Soros family, the last of which drew allegations from The Jerusalem Post that she was "reproducing antisemitic conspiracy theories" by associating Soros and Braun, who are both Jewish, with "greed and profiting off the pandemic". Big Machine Records initially listed the record with a 2017 release date, but it was later adjusted to 2008 to reflect the fact that the recordings were available on Clear Channel websites in 2008.

Critical reception
Music critic Quinn Moreland from Pitchfork wrote that Live from Clear Channel is predictable, failing to match the standards of Swift's past work, and dubbed it as a "cheap bootleg" and "a shameless cash-grab". Moreland commented that the unapproved release looks "eerily similar" to occasions when fake or leaked music appears on streaming services without the concerned artists' authorization—releases where "scammers hold the reins and the real creator never sees a dime".

Commercial performance
Live from Clear Channel Stripped 2008 sold 33 units in the United States and the YouTube audio videos of its eight tracks accumulated 6,000 views combined in its first three days. The commercial failure was attributed to Swift's denouncement of the album on her social media; the album did not enter any Billboard chart.

Track listing
"Love Story" (Swift) – 3:41
"Fearless" (Hillary Lindsey, Liz Rose, Swift) – 3:18
"Beautiful Eyes" (Swift) – 2:56
"Untouchable" (Swift, Cary Barlowe, Nathan Barlowe, and Tommy Lee James) – 3:42
"Teardrops on My Guitar" (Swift and Rose) – 3:16
"Picture to Burn" (Swift and Rose) – 2:53
"Should've Said No" (Swift) – 3:48
"Change" (Swift) – 4:18

Personnel 
 Taylor Swift – vocals, production, acoustic guitar (tracks: 2, 4), electric guitar (track 7)
 Scott Borchetta – production, executive production
 Ben Clark – banjo (tracks: 3, 5, 7, 8)
 Chris Costello – recording supervision (tracks: 1, 2, 3, 4, 5, 7, 8)
 Caitlin Evanson – fiddle, backing vocals (tracks: 1, 3, 5, 6, 7, 8)
 Evan Harrison – production, executive production
 Amos Heller – bass guitar (tracks: 1, 3, 5, 6, 7, 8)
 Mike Meadows – banjo (tracks: 3, 5, 7, 8)
 Grant Mickelson – acoustic guitar (tracks: 3, 5, 7, 8), bass guitar (track 6)
 Jonathan Russell – mastering (tracks: 1, 2, 3, 4, 5, 7, 8)
 Paul Sidoti – acoustic guitar (tracks: 1, 3, 5, 7), electric guitar (track 8); backing vocals (tracks: 1, 3, 5, 6, 7, 8)
 Al Wilson – drums (tracks: 1, 3, 5, 6, 7, 8)

See also
List of 2020 albums

References

External links

2020 live albums
Big Machine Records live albums
Taylor Swift live albums
Albums produced by Taylor Swift